Football Club Aragats, was an Armenian football club based in the town of Ashtarak, Aragatsotn Province. They play their home games at the Kasakhi Marzik Stadium in Ashtarak.

History
On 5 June 2019, FC Aragats was officially founded in Ashtarak by Hakob Fahradyan. In its first year of foundation, Aragats applied to take part in the Armenian First League. On 15 June 2019, Varazdat Avetisyan was appointed as head coach of the team. However, after less than a month, Avetsiyan left his post on 9 July.

Managerial history
  Varazdat Avetisyan (15 June 2019 – 9 July 2019)

References

Football clubs in Armenia
Association football clubs established in 2019
2019 establishments in Armenia